Lake Murphy is a lake in King County, Washington. Klinkhammer Lakes lie at an elevation of 4,751 feet (1,448 m).

References

Murphy
Murphy
Mount Baker-Snoqualmie National Forest